The name Firth of Forth Banks Complex refers to a complex of sand and gravel sea banks in the North Sea, lying at the mouth of the Firth of Forth in the seas off the east coast of Scotland. From south to north the banks are named the Berwick Bank, the Scalp Bank, the Wee Bankie and the Montrose Bank.

The seabed of the banks is formed of many different types of sands and gravels, and is highly influenced by the strong currents at the mouth of the Firth of Forth. This creates a highly productive habitat, which supports a rich array of sea creatures including  crabs, starfish, flatfish, seals and dolphins; the Berwick Bank in particular is noted as an important spawning ground for plaice. The sand and gravel of the banks also support ocean quahog, a large and slow growing clam which have a lifespan of more than 400 years and are thus considered to be amongst the oldest living animals on Earth.

The richness of the seas here means that the banks are also important for seabirds nesting on the east coast of Scotland, which regularly visit the area to feed.

References

Nature Conservation Marine Protected Areas of Scotland
Sandbanks of the North Sea
Geology of Scotland